Yoshimizu is a surname. Notable people with the surname include:

Hidenori Yoshimizu (born 1961), Japanese composer
Kagami Yoshimizu (born 1977), Japanese manga author
Kei Yoshimizu (born 1940), Japanese actor
Norio Yoshimizu (born 1946), Japanese footballer
Takahiro Yoshimizu (born 1968), Japanese voice actor

Japanese-language surnames